Oval-Teen was an indie pop band from the town of Yorkville, Illinois. Started in 1994 as a songwriting outlet for Bradley Davis, Chad Lynd and Joseph Chellino. Influenced by the sounds of punk and Teenage Fanclub their early three-chord pop expanded as their playing and songwriting improved and expanded to include new wave and Bubblegum. The band began releasing cassettes and EPs on their own Debris label, and attracted the attention of other self-run small labels around the country and Japan who also released some of their recordings. In 1999, the band recorded their only full-length album, A Million Shades of Oval-teen, for MOC Records but financial problems at the label delayed its release until 2001. The group broke up in 1999 when Bradley Davis relocated to Toronto following his marriage. Posthumous recordings surfaced slowly on Toronto's My Mean Magpie label and a double CD collection of stray tracks was released on Bi-Fi Records in 2004. Brad continues to release records as Lake Holiday (band), Joseph denies any responsibility for records under the names Jonas Crenshaw and Power Craig, Jeremiah keeps busy as a member of Paper Airplane Pilots and generally being tall. Chad lives with his dogs and releases albums with The Bloody Knife Killers, The Tiger Springs and The Sky Lovelies.

Discography
Albums 
 A Million Shades of Oval-Teen, M.O.C. Records (MMM74295), (2001) CD
 Kissing Ghosts, My Mean Magpie Records (MMM023), (2003) digital release
 Yorkville, IL, Bi-Fi Records (Bi-Fi CD034), (2004) CD

Singles & EPs 
 Show me around, Debris Miracle Network, (dr001), (1995) 7"
 Split w/Pets or Meat, Debris Miracle Network, (dr002), (1996) 7"
 Just Say Oval-Teen, 40 song EP, DMN, (1997/8) cassette only
 Falling in love all over again, once more for the very first time, M.O.C. Records, (1997) 7"
 the "Headstart ep, OK/Whiggs Records (mwr007), (1999) 7"
 Happy Christmas...From Oval-Teen, OK/Whiggs Records (mwr010), (1999) 7"
 Lemon-Cakes & Chocolate Shakes EP, Whiggs Records (mwr019), (2000) 7"
 Don't Think for a Minute, My Mean Magpie Records (MMM014), (2001) digital release

Compilations 
 Debris Karaoke Party Machine, Debris Miracle Network, (1997) cassette only
 El Ropin Banas-Fuck El Earth, M.O.C. Records, (1998) 7"
 I Made It Out of Clay: A Hanukkah Pop Compilation, Shirley Beans Records (BEAN01), (1999)
 Peeler: for Right or Left-Handed Use, My Mean Magpie Records (MMM020), (2001) digital release
 Ten; Ten, My Mean Magpie Records (MMM010), (2002) digital release

External links
 Oval-Teen on MySpace
 The Bloody Knife Killers on Myspace

Indie pop groups from Illinois